Jacinto is a small unincorporated community in Glenn County, California.

A post office was established at Jacinto March 19, 1858 and operated until November 15, 1910. Jacinto was the home of Dr. Hugh J. Glenn, a prominent figure in California politics.

References

Unincorporated communities in California
Unincorporated communities in Glenn County, California